Sir Anthony Michael Goodenough  (born 1941) is a British retired diplomat, and High Commissioner to Canada from 1996 to 2000.

Goodenough is the son of Rear-Admiral Michael Grant Goodenough and Nancy Slater, daughter of Sir Ransford Slater; and the grandson of the banker Frederick Goodenough. He was educated at Wellington College and New College, Oxford.

References

1941 births
Living people
Anthony
Knights Commander of the Order of St Michael and St George
British diplomats
High Commissioners of the United Kingdom to Canada
High Commissioners of the United Kingdom to Ghana
Knights of the Order of St John
Members of HM Diplomatic Service
People educated at Wellington College, Berkshire
Alumni of New College, Oxford
20th-century British diplomats